Play for P.I.N.K. (Prevention, Immediate diagnosis, New technology and Knowledge) is a fundraising organization founded by Laura Lassman in 1990. Lassman first organized a tournament in Bergen County, New Jersey to support a friend undergoing breast cancer treatment. Since then Play for P.I.N.K. has served as a catalyst for 300 fundraisers held by volunteers in 28 states annually. In December 2013, the Board of Play for P.I.N.K. gave The Breast Cancer Research Foundation a donation of $4,250,000; a record-breaking amount. Through 2014 Play for P.I.N.K. volunteers raised $34 million for breast cancer research; funding 17 research projects in the 2014 fiscal year.

Bloomberg underwrites administrative costs so that 100% of all funds raised are donated directly to a sole beneficiary, The Breast Cancer Research Foundation. Other corporate partners include the Estée Lauder Companies, which provides products for gift bags, and Wilson Sporting Goods who supply golf and tennis balls.

The Wall Street Journal reports: "Where other organizations may see fatigue with walks, runs and other sporting events, Ms. Lassman says that Play for P.I.N.K. has grown annually. "We're going strong," she says. "Every day we keep getting more and more calls; we are not waning."

References
 Delta Sky Magazine
 Wall Street Journal, "Playing Through for Cancer Research" Aug. 27, 2012

External links
http://www.playforpink.org
http://www.bcrfcure.org

Cancer fundraisers